South Street is a hamlet in the far south of the London Borough of Bromley,  south south-east from Charing Cross.

Since the early 1920s, the area has more generally been known as Westerham Hill, the name South Street having fallen out of favour for being overly specific part of Westerham Hill is the highest point in London and as with all of the North Downs its southern face is quite sheer. The south face here is in Kent.

Like neighbouring villages, South Street’s principal crop was strawberries, grown on a dozen farms and sold at Covent Garden; grass for grazing (pasture) and haymaking, tending, including shearing of sheep, cows and other animals provided other main agricultural income. South Street also staged an annual horse show and had a stud farm.

References

Districts of the London Borough of Bromley
Hamlets in the London Borough of Bromley